New Elstree Studios was a British film studio complex that was the main production centre for the Danziger Brothers from 1956 to 1962, and was one of several sites collectively known as "Elstree Studios". 60 B-movies and 350 half-hour TV episodes were filmed there, for both British and American markets.

History
Edward and Harry Danziger were American-born brothers who moved to Britain in 1952 and began making television films, using resources at various facilities including London's Riverside Studios, Shepperton, Borehamwood and Nettlefold. 

In 1955, the Danzigers decided to form their own studio base and founded the New Elstree Studios in Hertfordshire. They converted a former wartime aero-engine testing factory, west of the Aldenham Reservoir near the village of Elstree, into a studio with six sound stages and exterior shooting facilities. The  site employed 200 and was used mainly for second features and television series, to be sold in both Britain and America.

The Danzigers' aim was to produce films as quickly and as cheaply as possible, regardless of quality. By the time of the studios' official opening in 1956, over twenty productions had already been filmed there. The studios operated as an assembly line, producing some 60 B-movies and 350 half-hour TV episodes between 1955 and 1961, typically producing two TV episodes a week, or a second feature in ten days.   

The site was closed in 1962 and sold to RTZ Metals in October 1965 for warehouse storage. Since the late 1980s, the site has been occupied by the Waterfront Business Park on the A411 Elstree Road.

List of films shot at New Elstree Studios
This is a chronological list of films (including television series on film) that were shot at New Elstree Studios. All were produced by Danziger Productions or Danziger Photoplays, except those indicated otherwise.

Other Danziger productions
The following films were produced by the Danzigers, and are therefore very likely to have been shot at New Elstree Studios, but it is possible that a small number were shot elsewhere.

See also
 :Category:Films shot at New Elstree Studios
 :Category:Television shows shot at New Elstree Studios
 Lists of productions shot at the other Elstree studios:
 List of films and television shows shot at Elstree Studios
 List of films and television shows shot at Clarendon Road Studios
 
 
 List of films shot at MGM-British Studios, Elstree

References

British film studios
Television studios in England
Buildings and structures in Hertfordshire
Hertsmere
Demolished buildings and structures in England
History of Hertfordshire
History of television in the United Kingdom